Jeremy O’Sullivan (born 19 August 1989) is an Australian skier and sighted guide for visually impaired skiers. He was Shaun Pianta's guide at the 2018 Winter Paralympics.
 
O'Sullivan was born and raised in Bright, Victoria.

O’Sullivan started competitive alpine skiing in 2000. He became the guide for Shaun Pianta in 2015. Prior to Pianta, O'Sullivan was guide to Jessica Gallagher and Prue Watt. At the  2016/17 World Para-alpine skiing Europa Cup event in Veysonnaz, Switzerland, in their first major international competition, Pianta and O'Sullivan posted career-best scores in the Men's Super G and Giant Slalom.

At the 2018 Winter Paralympics, Pianta and O'Sullivan competed in two events - 14th in the Men's Giant Slalom Visually Impaired and did not finish in the Men's Slalom Visually Impaired.

References

1989 births
Living people
People from Bright, Victoria
Australian male alpine skiers
Alpine skiers at the 2018 Winter Paralympics
Paralympic alpine skiers of Australia